Dyn or DYN may refer to:

 DYN (magazine)
 Dyne (dyn), a unit of force
 Dyn (company) (Dynamic Network Services, Inc., originally known as DynDNS), an Internet performance management company
 Dynorphin, a class of opioid peptides
 Nira Dyn, Israeli mathematician